(previously ) is a Danish company that operates ferry services between Jutland and Zealand, and also services to Bornholm. In March 2017, the routes in the Kattegat were renamed to Molslinjen.

History
Molslinjen was formed by DFDS in 1964 sailings commenced on 18 May 1966.

A downturn in traffic following the 1973 oil crisis led Molslinjen into a pooling agreement with rival Grenaa-Hundested Linien in 1979.

In 1984 DFDS sold Molslinjen and Grenaa-Hundested Linien to J. Lauritzen A/S. The company was sold 4 years later to Danish investment company DIFKO.

In 1999 Molslinjen merged with Scandlines subsidiary Cat-Link.

Scandlines sold its holding to the Clipper Group in 2008.

In July 2011, Molslinjen announced it was to terminate the Kalundborg – Aarhus route and sell the two vessels operating the route.

Molslinjen terminated the Aarhus – Kalundborg route on 15 September 2011. Thereafter the route was operated by Kattegatruten until October 2013 and then suspended.

In 2016 Molslinjen won a 10-year public tender to operate ferry services to Bornholm, and operations started in September 2018 under the name Bornholmslinjen.

In 2018, the ferry routes of Alslinjen, Langelandslinjen, Samsølinjen and Fanølinjen became part of Molslinjen with the acquisition of Danske Færger.

In January 2023, the Danish and Swedish competition regulators approved the sale of ForSea Ferries to Molslinjen for an undisclosed sum.

Fleet

Molslinjen 

Bornholms-linjen 

Langelandslinjen

Fanølinjen

Samsølinjen

Alslinjen

Routes

Molslinjen operates various routes around Denmark and surrounding countries, under a multitude of brand names.
Molslinjen
Odden – Ebeltoft (55 mins)
Odden – Aarhus (1 hr 20 mins)
 Bornholmslinjen
 Rønne – Ystad (1 hr 20 mins)
 Rønne – Sassnitz (3 hr 20 mins)
 Rønne – Køge (5 hr 30 mins)
 Samsølinjen
 Kalundborg – Ballen (Samsø) (1 hr 30 mins)
 Alslinjen
 Bøjden (Funen) – Fynshav (Als) (50 mins)
 Langelandslinjen
 Spodsbjerg – Tårs (45 mins)
 Fanølinjen
 Esbjerg – Nordby (12 mins)

References

External links

 

Ferry companies of Denmark
Danish companies established in 1964
Companies formerly listed on Nasdaq Copenhagen
Transport in Aarhus